Wiggins is a surname. Notable people with the surname include:

 Alan Wiggins (1958–1991), American baseball player
 Alan Wiggins Jr. (born 1985), American basketball player
 Andrew Wiggins (born 1995), Canadian basketball player, son of Mitchell Wiggins
 Bayley Wiggins (born 1994), New Zealand cricketer
 Bernice Love Wiggins (1897–1936), Texas poet
 Bradley Wiggins (born 1980), British cyclist, son of Gary Wiggins
 Brice Wiggins, American attorney and politician.
 Candice Wiggins (born 1987), American basketball player, daughter of Alan Wiggins
 Charles E. Wiggins (1927–2000), U.S. Representative from California, and later a United States federal judge
 Chris Wiggins, Canadian actor
 David Wiggins, British philosopher
 David Wiggins (jurist) (born 1951), American jurist
 Ezekiel Stone Wiggins, Canadian author, Ottawa Prophet
 Gary Wiggins, Australian cyclist
 Gerald Wiggins, American jazz pianist and organist
 Graham Wiggins, American musician
 Guy C. Wiggins, (1883–1962), American painter
 Ira Loren Wiggins (1899–1987), American botanist
 James "Boodle It" Wiggins, American blues singer and musician
 James Wiggins (disambiguation), multiple people
 Jermaine Wiggins, American football player
 Joe Wiggins, (1909–1982), English professional football player
 John & Audrey Wiggins, American Country music duo
 Joseph Wiggins (1832–1905), English mariner
 Keith Wiggins, British motor racing team owner
 Kim Douglas Wiggins, American sculptor
 Laura Slade Wiggins, American television and film actress and musician
 Marianne Wiggins, American novelist and former wife of Salman Rushdie
 Mary Wiggins (1904-1974), American composer, educator and organist
 Mike Wiggins, American businessman and politician 
 Mitchell Wiggins (born 1959), American basketball player
 Stephen Wiggins, American applied mathematician
 Thomas "Blind Tom" Wiggins (1849–1908), American pianist
 Wiley Wiggins, American actor

See also
 Wiggin

de:Wiggins
fr:Wiggins